Ro is a comune (municipality) in the Province of Ferrara in the Italian region Emilia-Romagna, located about  northeast of Bologna and about  northeast of Ferrara.

The municipality of Ro contains the frazioni (subdivisions, mainly villages and hamlets) Alberone, Guarda, Ruina, and Zocca.

Ro borders the following municipalities: Berra, Canaro, Copparo, Crespino, Ferrara, Guarda Veneta, Polesella.

Demographic evolution

References

External links
 www.comune.ro.fe.it/

Cities and towns in Emilia-Romagna